Russell Wyer is an Australian former professional rugby league footballer who played in the 1990s for the Western Suburbs Magpies, Newcastle Knights and the Parramatta Eels in the National Rugby League competition.

Playing career
Wyer made his first grade debut for Western Suburbs in 1990 at the age of 18 scoring 2 tries in his first game against Penrith.  

After 4 years at Wests, Wyer joined Newcastle in 1994 and finished top try scorer at the club.  In 1995, Wyer joined Parramatta and in 1997 played in both finals matches for the club, this was the first time since 1986 that Parramatta had qualified for the finals.  

Wyer's final match in first grade was the 1997 elimination final loss against North Sydney.

Sources
 Whiticker, Alan & Hudson, Glen (2006) The Encyclopedia of Rugby League Players, Gavin Allen Publishing, Sydney

References

Australian rugby league players
Newcastle Knights players
Parramatta Eels players
Living people
1972 births
Rugby league players from Sydney
Western Suburbs Magpies players